These are the Billboard magazine R&B albums that reached number-one in 1973.

Chart history

See also
1973 in music
R&B number-one hits of 1973 (USA)

1973